Yuliya Beygelzimer and Tatiana Poutchek were the defending champions, but competed this year with different partners. Poutchek teamed up with Darya Kustova and lost in the first round to Adriana Serra Zanetti and Antonella Serra Zanetti, while Beygelzimer teamed up with Silvija Talaja and lost in semifinals to Marion Bartoli and Mara Santangelo.

Adriana Serra Zanetti and Antonella Serra Zanetti won the title by defeating Marion Bartoli and Mara Santangelo 1–6, 6–3, 6–4 in the final.

Seeds

Draw

Draw

References
 Official results archive (ITF)
 Official results archive (WTA)

Tashkent Open - Doubles
2004 Tashkent Open